Ekaterina Vadimovna Pankova (born 2 February 1990), from 2013 to 2016 Kosianenko, is a Russian volleyball player, who plays as an setter. She is a member of the Russia women's national volleyball team and plays for Dynamo Moscow at club level.

Career
She started playing volleyball at the youth teams of Uralochka before starting her professional career in 2007 at Zarechie Odintsovo. With them she won the Russian Super League in 2007–08 and 2009–10, the Russian Cup in 2007 and the CEV Women's Challenge Cup in 2013–14. She moved to Dynamo Moscow in 2014 and at the club she won the Russian Super League in 2015–16.

With the Russia women's national volleyball team, she has participated at youth and senior competitions, being part of the teams which played the 2013 Summer Universiade in Kazan, the Montreux Volley Masters (in 2013, 2014), the FIVB Volleyball World Grand Prix (in 2011, 2013, 2014, 2015, 2016), the European Championships (in 2013, 2015), the 2014 FIVB Volleyball Women's World Championship in Italy, the 2015 FIVB Volleyball Women's World Cup in Japan, and the 2016 Summer Olympics in Rio de Janeiro.

Personal life
She is the daughter of Vadim Pankov and Marina Pankova (née Nikulina). Her family has a tradition in volleyball, her father is the current coach of Zarechie Odintsovo and her mother played in three Olympic Games (gold in Seoul 1988, silver in Barcelona 1992 and fourth in Atlanta 1996), and was world champion at the 1990 FIVB Volleyball Women's World Championship. Her younger brother Pavel Pankov is also a volleyball player.

Awards

Individuals
 2013 European Championship "Best Setter"
 2014 Montreux Volley Masters "Best Setter"

National team

Junior
 2005 Girls' Youth European Volleyball Championship –  Silver medal
 2005 FIVB Volleyball Girls' U18 World Championship –  Silver medal
 2007 FIVB Volleyball Girls' U18 World Championship –  Bronze medal
 2008 Women's Junior European Volleyball Championship –  Silver medal
 2013 Universiade –  Gold medal

Senior
 2013 Montreux Volley Masters –  Silver medal
 2013 European Championship –  Gold medal
 2014 Montreux Volley Masters –  Bronze medal
 2014 FIVB World Grand Prix –  Bronze medal
 2015 FIVB World Grand Prix –  Silver medal
 2015 European Championship –  Gold medal

Clubs
 2007 Russian Cup –  Gold medal (with Zarechie Odintsovo)
 2007–08 CEV Champions League –  Silver medal (with Zarechie Odintsovo)
 2007–08 Russian Championship –  Gold medal (with Zarechie Odintsovo)
 2008–09 Russian Championship –  Silver medal (with Zarechie Odintsovo)
 2009 Russian Cup –  Silver medal (with Zarechie Odintsovo)
 2009–10 Russian Championship –  Gold medal (with Zarechie Odintsovo)
 2013–14 CEV Challenge Cup –  Gold medal (with Zarechie Odintsovo)
 2014–15 Russian Championship –  Silver medal (with Dinamo Moscow)
 2015–16 Russian Championship –  Gold medal (with Dinamo Moscow)
 2016 Russian Cup –  Silver medal (with Dinamo Moscow)
 2016–17 Russian Championship –  Gold medal (with Dinamo Moscow)

References

External links
 Ekaterina Kosianenko at the International Volleyball Federation
 
  
 
 

1990 births
Living people
Russian women's volleyball players
Sportspeople from Yekaterinburg
Olympic volleyball players of Russia
Volleyball players at the 2016 Summer Olympics
Universiade medalists in volleyball
Universiade gold medalists for Russia
20th-century Russian women
21st-century Russian women